Ərəblər or Arablyar or Arablar may refer to:
Ərəblər, Barda, Azerbaijan
Ərəblər, Davachi, Azerbaijan